Nikolaus Herman (first name also Nicolaus or Niklas;  1500 – 3 May 1561) was a German Lutheran cantor and teacher, creating numerous Protestant hymns. Some of them are contained in hymnals in several languages.

Career 

Herman was born in Altdorf. In 1518 he came as cantor and teacher at the Latin School of Joachimsthal (now Jáchymov, Bohemia). He was a supporter of the Reformation; a letter of Martin Luther to him is dated 6 November 1524. He collaborated with people such as Johannes Mathesius, who served there from 1532 as principal of the school, and from 1540 as a pastor. On 24 June 1557 Herman retired. He published his hymns, which he wrote primarily for teaching children, in 1560 under the title  (The Sundays' Gospels through the year in songs written for the children and Christian fathers).

Hymns 

Several of his hymns are part of present-day hymnals, such as the current German Protestant hymnal  (EG) and the Catholic hymnal Gotteslob (GL).

He created text and melody for a few hymns:

 "" (also: "allzugleich") (Praise God, you Christians all the same) (EG 27, GL 134): The hymn text was published in 1560, with a melody Herman had already published in 1554 (then as tune of "", Zahn No. 198).
 "" (EG 106, GL 225)

He wrote the text of:
 ""
 "" (part of EG 29)
 "" (EG 141)
 "" (EG 413)
 "" (EG 437, GL 667)
 "" (EG 467)
 "" (EG 498)
 "" (EG 522, stanzas 1–4, GL 658), a fifth stanza added by an anonymous writer, with a melody possibly by Herman, based on older melodies

Johann Sebastian Bach used stanzas from his hymns in several cantatas. In the cantata for Easter Sunday 1715, Bach used the melody of "" instrumentally in movement 8, stanza 5 as the closing chorale, movement 9. Bach closed  (1723), with stanza 4 of the same hymn. The first stanza of "" appears in the center of the cantata for the first Sunday after Easter  (1724), a stanza from "" in Süßer Trost, mein Jesus kömmt, BWV 151, for the third day of Christmas 1725, and the hymn's final stanza to close  for the third day of Easter (1729). In his Orgelbüchlein, he composed organ preludes on "" (BWV 609) and the Easter hymn "" (BWV 629).

Several hymns were translated to Danish and English and included in hymnals, such as the Danish . "Lobt Gott, ihr Christen alle gleich" was translated to "Let all together praise our God" by A. T. Russell, as No. 52 in his Psalms & Hymns, 1851, and to "Praise ye the Lord, ye Christians" E. Cronenwett, as No. 31 in the Ohio Lutheran Hymnal, 1880, among others.

Sources 
 
 
 Philipp Wackernagel, Das deutsche Kirchenlied von der ältesten Zeit bis zu Anfang des 17.Jahrhunderts. 5 vol. 1855; all texts by Nikolaus Herman in vol. 2

References

External links 

 
 
 Nikolaus Herman Christliche Liederdatenbank 

Renaissance composers
1500s births
1561 deaths
Year of birth uncertain
German Lutheran hymnwriters
People from Nürnberger Land
German-language poets